Caroline Milmoe (born 11 January 1963) is an English stage, film and television actress best known for playing Julie in the first two series of Carla Lane's Liverpool-based BBC sit-com Bread and Lisa Duckworth in ITV's long-running soap opera Coronation Street.

Career
Milmoe attended Manchester's Contact Youth Theatre in her teens, before going on to make frequent stage and screen appearances in the mid-1980s and early '90s. She played reporter Maggie Troon in the second series of LWT's situation comedy Hot Metal. Written by David Renwick and Andrew Marshall, it satirised the 1980s tabloid press in Britain. Additionally, Milmoe appeared in The Magic Toyshop, The Bill and Agatha Christie's Poirot, On 18 December 2005, she appeared in Coronation Street: The Duckworth Family Album.

Filmography

Film

Television

References

External links

1963 births
Living people
English television actresses
Actresses from Manchester
English stage actresses
English film actresses